Leo Paul Sack (May 18, 1914 – January 2, 1987) was an American professional basketball player. He played in the National Basketball League in six games for the Cincinnati Comellos during the 1937–38 season and averaged 7.2 points per game. He played college football and basketball at Xavier University.

References

1914 births
1987 deaths
American men's basketball players
Basketball players from Cincinnati
Cincinnati Comellos players
Guards (basketball)
Xavier Musketeers football players
Xavier Musketeers men's basketball players